Disney Channel Hits: Take 2 is a CD and DVD collection of songs and music videos from Disney Channel Original Movies and the follow-up to Disney Channel Hits: Take 1 (2004). Released on April 24, 2005, the CD includes songs from The Cheetah Girls, Stuck in the Suburbs, Pixel Perfect, Zenon: Z3, Halloweentown High, Tiger Cruise and a bonus track by Christy Carlson Romano. The DVD includes four music videos of select songs from the CD.

Track listing 
"Good Life" - Jesse McCartney (from Stuck in the Suburbs)
"Over It" - Anneliese van der Pol (from Stuck in the Suburbs)
"A Whatever Life" - Haylie Duff (from Stuck in the Suburbs)
"Cinderella" (Remix) - The Cheetah Girls (from The Cheetah Girls)
"Cheetah Sisters" - The Cheetah Girls (from The Cheetah Girls)
"Girl Power" (Remix) - The Cheetah Girls (from The Cheetah Girls)
"My Hero Is You" - Hayden Panettiere (from Tiger Cruise)
"Anyone But Me" - Christy Carlson Romano (from Zenon: Z3)
"Out of This World" - Cosmic Blush and Proto Zoa (from Zenon: Z3)
"Notice Me" - Zetta Bytes (from Pixel Perfect)
"Perfectly" - Huckapoo (from Pixel Perfect)
"When The Rain Falls" - Zetta Bytes (from Pixel Perfect)
"Strange World" - Jessie Payo (from Halloweentown High)
"Good Life" (Remix) - Jesse McCartney (from Stuck in the Suburbs)
"Dive In" - Christy Carlson Romano (from Greatest Disney TV & Film Hits) (bonus track)

While the majority of songs on this compilation were all previously released on their respective soundtrack albums, the songs "My Hero Is You" and "Strange World" were exclusive to this compilation prior to the release of The Very Best of Disney Channel (2007), released in the United Kingdom.

Bonus music videos 
"Cinderella" - The Cheetah Girls
"Good Life" - Jesse McCartney
"Get Your Shine On" - Jesse McCartney
"Dive In" - Christy Carlson Romano

References 

Walt Disney Records compilation albums
Disney Channel albums
Television soundtracks
2005 compilation albums
2005 video albums
Music video compilation albums